Puerta refers to the old original gates of the Walled City of Intramuros in Manila.

Puerta may also refer to:

People
Antonio Puerta, Spanish footballer
Alonso José Puerta, Spanish politician
Lina Puerta, American artist
Mariano Puerta, Argentinian tennis player
Ramón Puerta, Argentinian politician

See also
 
 Puerto (disambiguation)